Drosera hamiltonii, the rosy sundew, is a small, compact species in the carnivorous plant genus Drosera and is the only species in the monotypic subgenus Stelogyne. It is endemic to coastal swamps in south-west Western Australia. It was first described by Cecil Rollo Payton Andrews in 1903 and placed in section Stelogyne as the only species by Ludwig Diels in 1906. In 1994, Rüdiger Seine and Wilhelm Barthlott suggested D. hamiltonii belonged in their section Drosera, reducing section Stelogyne to synonymy with section Drosera. In 1996, Jan Schlauer revised the genus classification and elevated section Stelogyne to a subgenus, arguing that the unique fused styles requires segregation at more than a sectional rank.

See also
List of Drosera species

References

External links

Carnivorous plants of Australia
Caryophyllales of Australia
hamiltonii
Eudicots of Western Australia
Plants described in 1903